The 2018 Prime Minister Cup was the second edition of Prime Minister One Day Cup, which featured 10 teams.

Group stage

Group A

Group B

Semi-finals

Final

Statistics

Most runs

Most wickets

References

External links
 Series home at ESPN Cricinfo

Prime Minister Cup
Prime Minister Cup